Doug Petersen may refer to:

 Douglas W. Petersen (1948–2014), American politician in Massachusetts
 Doug Petersen (Canadian football) (born 1969), Canadian football defensive lineman

See also
 Douglas Peterson (disambiguation)
 Doug Pederson, American football coach